Percy Williams may refer to:
 Percy Williams (sprinter) (1908–1982), Canadian athlete
 Percy Williams (New Zealand rugby league player), played for Wigan and New Zealand in the 1910s
 Percy Williams (Australian rugby league player) (1910–1996), played for New South Wales and Australia in the 1930s
 Percy Williams (rugby union) (born 1993), South African rugby union player
 Percy G. Williams (1857–1923), American vaudeville performer, theater owner and manager